= Iaza =

Town of ancient Lydia

Coordinates: 38°35′13″N 28°36′24″E

Iaza was a town of ancient Lydia, inhabited during Roman times. Its name does not occur among ancient authors, but is inferred from epigraphic and other evidence.

Its site is located near Ayazviran (Ayazören) in Asiatic Turkey.
